Arthur Navez (1881 in Ghent - 1931 near Brussels) was a Belgian painter belonging to the fauvist movement.

References

Belgian painters
1881 births
1931 deaths